Azura may refer to:

Entertainment
 Azura (Elder Scrolls), a fictional supernatural entity in The Elder Scrolls video games
 "Azura", song on the album Don Solaris by 808 State
 Azura, the alias of character Romwell Jr in the Gorgeous Carat manga
 Azura, a character in the Di-Gata Defenders television series
 Azura, a fictional island fortress in Gears of War 3
 Azura, the secondary main playable character from Fire Emblem Fates
 Azura, Queen of the Witch People, in the "Flash Gordon" franchise
 Thena, a character in the Marvel Comics universe, also known as Azura
 Azura, a character in the Barbie: Fairytopia franchise
 The Good Witch Azura, a book character in the Owl House universe.

Other uses
 Azura (Hong Kong), an apartment building in Hong Kong
 Azura (religious figure), daughter of Adam and Eve
 Azura (wave power device)
 Azura, Numidia, a titular see in the Roman Catholic Church
 Azura Skye (born 1981), American actress
 Azura Thermal Power Station, a natural gas powered power station in Nigeria
 MS Azura, a cruise ship in the P&O Cruises fleet

See also
 Azzurra, a yacht racing team
 Azur (disambiguation)
 Azure (disambiguation)